The 2017 Baltimore Orioles season was the 117th season in Baltimore Orioles franchise history, the 64th in Baltimore, and the 26th at Oriole Park at Camden Yards. Despite a modest 22–10 start to the season, they failed to improve from their 89–73 record from 2016. They were eliminated from playoff contention on September 23 with their loss to the Tampa Bay Rays,  behind the Minnesota Twins for the 2nd AL Wild Card spot. With their 82nd loss, also on September 23, they ensured a sub-.500 record for the second time under manager Buck Showalter. They finished the season , their first losing season since 2011.

Offseason
November 3: LF Steve Pearce activated from the 60-day disabled list; CF Michael Bourn, CF Drew Stubbs, C Matt Wieters, DH Pedro Alvarez, RHP Tommy Hunter, LF Steve Pearce, LHP Brian Duensing, & LF Nolan Reimold elected free agency.
November 4: LF Joey Rickard & LHP Chris Lee activated from the 60-day disabled list.
November 8: LHP Jed Bradley sent outright to AAA Norfolk.
November 18: Baltimore Orioles selected the contracts of RHP Jesus Liranzo from AA Bowie & of RHP Joe Gunkel from AAA Norfolk.
November 30: New York Mets traded RHP Logan Verrett to Baltimore Orioles for cash.

December 2: RHP Vance Worley elected free agency; Baltimore Orioles claimed OF Adam Walker off waivers from Milwaukee Brewers.
December 8: Baltimore Orioles selected OF Anthony Santander in the Rule 5 Draft from Cleveland Indians & OF Aneury Tavarez in the Rule 5 Draft from Boston Red Sox.
December 13: Baltimore Orioles signed free agent RHP Logan Ondrusek.
December 16: Baltimore Orioles signed free agent C Welington Castillo.

January 6: Seattle Mariners traded RF Seth Smith to Baltimore Orioles for RHP Yovani Gallardo & cash.
January 20: Baltimore Orioles signed free agent RF Mark Trumbo.

February 10: Baltimore Orioles designated C Francisco Pena for assignment; New York Mets traded RHP Gabriel Ynoa to Baltimore Orioles for cash.
February 15: Baltimore Orioles designated LHP T.J. McFarland for assignment.
February 19: Los Angeles Dodgers traded LHP Vidal Nuño to Baltimore Orioles for RHP Ryan Moseley.
February 20: Baltimore Orioles designated LF Christian Walker for assignment.
February 21: New York Yankees traded LHP Richard Bleier to Baltimore Orioles for Player To Be Named Later.
February 24: Baltimore Orioles released LHP T. J. McFarland.
February 25: Atlanta Braves claimed 1B Christian Walker off waivers from Baltimore Orioles.

March 7: OF Dariel Alvarez optioned to AAA Norfolk.
March 8: RHP Parker Bidwell & RHP Jason Garcia optioned to AAA Norfolk.
March 13: Baltimore Orioles signed free agent DH Pedro Alvarez to a minor league contract & invited him to spring training.
March 14: RHP Joe Gunkel optioned to AAA Norfolk.
March 15: Baltimore Orioles released RHP Logan Ondrusek.
March 19: RHP Jesus Liranzo optioned to AAA Norfolk.
March 22: LHP Richard Bleier optioned  to AAA Norfolk.
March 25: LHP Chris Lee optioned to AAA Norfolk.
March 28: RHP Mike Wright optioned to AAA Norfolk; Philadelphia Phillies traded RHP Alec Asher to Baltimore Orioles for cash.
March 29: Baltimore Orioles placed OF Aneury Tavarez on waivers.
March 30: RHP Logan Verrett & RHP Alec Asher optioned to AAA Norfolk.
March 31: Baltimore Orioles signed free agent 1B Ryan Ripken to a minor league contract.

Regular season

Transactions

Contracts
April 2: RF Aneury Tavarez returned to Boston Red Sox from Baltimore Orioles.
April 6: Texas Rangers traded LHP Andrew Faulkner to Baltimore Orioles for cash; Baltimore Orioles released RF Dariel Alvarez.
April 7: Colorado Rockies traded RHP Miguel Castro to Baltimore Orioles for a player to be named later.
April 10: Baltimore Orioles traded RHP Joe Gunkel to Los Angeles Dodgers for a player to be named later. 
April 13: Contract of RHP Stefan Crichton selected from AAA Norfolk; Milwaukee Brewers traded RHP Damien Magnifico to Baltimore Orioles for future considerations.
April 14: Baltimore Orioles traded RHP Oliver Drake to Milwaukee Brewers for cash; Seattle Mariners traded LHP Paul Fry to Baltimore Orioles for future considerations.
April 17: RHP Jason Garcia sent outright to AA Bowie; Baltimore Orioles traded RHP Parker Bridwell to Los Angeles Angels for future considerations.

May 1: RHP Mike Wright assigned to Norfolk Tides.
May 2: Contract of C Francisco Pena selected from Norfolk Tides; RHP Damien Magnifico designated for assignment.
May 6: Baltimore Orioles traded RHP Damien Magnifico to Los Angeles Angels for RHP Jordan Kipper.
May 14: OF Craig Gentry sent outright to AAA Norfolk.
May 17: C Francisco Pena designated for assignment.
May 20: Chicago White Sox traded LHP Alex Katz to Baltimore Orioles for future considerations.
May 21: Contract of Paul Janish selected from AAA Norfolk.
May 23: C Francisco Pena sent outright to AAA Norfolk; Baltimore Orioles released OF Michael Bourne from minor league contract.
May 24: Baltimore Orioles claimed SS Luis Sardinas off waivers from San Diego Padres.
May 26: SS Luis Sardinas sent outright to AAA Norfolk.
May 31: Contract of C Francisco Pena selected from AAA Norfolk.

June 4: LHP Paul Fry sent outright to AAA Norfolk; New York Yankees traded SS Ruben Tejada to Baltimore Orioles for cash.
June 6: SS Paul Janish designated for assignment; Contract of SS Ruben Tejada selected from AAA Norfolk.
June 7: Contract of RHP Edwin Jackson selected from AAA Norfolk.
June 10: C Francisco Pena designated for assignment; Baltimore Orioles signed LF Adam Brett Walker.
June 11: RHP Edwin Jackson designated for assignment; Contract of RHP Jimmy Yacabonis selected from AAA Norfolk.
June 13: C Francisco Pena sent outright to AAA Norfolk; RHP Edwin Jackson elected free agency.
June 14: Contract of 1B David Washington selected from AAA Norfolk.
June 19: Contract of SS Paul Janish selected from AAA Norfolk.
June 20: Contract of LF Craig Gentry selected from AAA Norfolk.

July 6: 1B David Washington designated for assignment; Contract of 2B Johnny Giavotella selected from AAA Norfolk.
July 8: SS Paul Janish designated for assignment; Milwaukee Brewers traded RHP Aaron Myers to Baltimore Orioles for future considerations.
July 11: SS Paul Janish and 1B David Washington sent outright to AAA Norfolk.
July 14 LF Craig Gentry sent outright to AAA Norfolk.
July 29: Philadelphia Phillies traded RHP Jeremy Hellickson and cash to Baltimore Orioles for LF Hyun Soo Kim, LHP Garrett Cleavinger and future considerations.
July 30: Contract of LF Craig Gentry selected from AAA Norfolk .
July 31: New York Yankees traded RHP Yefry Ramirez to Baltimore Orioles for future considerations; Tampa Bay Rays traded SS Tim Beckham to Baltimore Orioles for RHP Tobias Myers; RHP Jeremy Hellickson activated.

August 1: SS Tim Beckham activated; 2B Johnny Giavotella designated for assignment.
August 3: 2B Johnny Giavotella sent outright to AAA Norfolk.
August 5: Texas Rangers traded 2B Brallan Perez to Baltimore Orioles for future considerations.
August 9: Baltimore Orioles traded RHP Steve Johnson to Chicago White Sox for cash; Baltimore Orioles signed LHP Raudel Lazo.
August 17: SS Ruben Tejada sent outright to AAA Norfolk.
August 23: LHP Vidal Nuno sent outright to AAA Norfolk.

September 1: Contracts of RHP Richard Rodriguez, 1B Pedro Alvarez, and C Chance Sisco selected from AAA Norfolk; RHP Tyler Wilson and RHP Logan Verrett designated for assignment.
September 5: RHP Tyler Wilson and RHP Logan Verrett sent outright to AAA Norfolk; Contract of CF Austin Hays selected from AA Bowie; LHP Jayson Aquino designated for assignment.
September 8: LHP Andrew Faulkner designated for assignment; LHP Jayson Aquino sent outright to AAA Norfolk.
September 9: LHP Jayson Aquino sent outright to AAA Norfolk.
September 13: LHP Andrew Faulkner sent outright to AAA Norfolk.
September 17: RHP Richard Rodriguez sent outright to AAA Norfolk and designated for assignment; Contract of LHP Tanner Scott selected from AA Bowie.

Callups & optional assignments
April 2: LHP Jayson Aquino & RHP Gabriel Ynoa optioned to AAA Norfolk; OF Craig Gentry recalled from AAA Norfolk.
April 13: RHP Damien Magnifico optioned to AAA Norfolk.
April 15: RHP Stefan Crichton optioned to AAA Norfolk; RHP Alec Asher recalled from AAA Norfolk.
April 16: RHP Stefan Crichton recalled from AAA Norfolk.
April 19: RHP Tyler Wilson optioned to AAA Norfolk; LHP Jayson Aquino recalled from AAA Norfolk.
April 25: RHP Stefan Crichton optioned to AAA Norfolk; LHP Paul Fry recalled from AAA Norfolk.
April 27: LHP Paul Fry optioned to AAA Norfolk.
April 30: LHP Jayson Aquino & LHP Vidal Nuno optioned to AAA Norfolk; RHP Logan Verrett & LHP Richard Bleier recalled form AAA Norfolk.

May 1: LHP Logan Verrett optioned to AAA Norfolk; RHP Mike Wright recalled from AAA Norfolk.
May 4: RHP Tyler Wilson & RHP Gabriel Ynoa recalled from AAA Norfolk; LHP Richard Bleier & RHP Alec Asher optioned to AAA Norfolk.
May 6: RHP Logan Verrett & RHP Alec Asher recalled from AAA Norfolk.
May 7: RHP Stefan Crichton optioned to AAA Norfolk.
May 10: RHP Logan Verrett optioned to AAA Norfolk; LHP Vidal Nuno recalled from AAA Norfolk.
May 14: LHP Vidal Nuno optioned to AAA Norfolk; LHP Richard Bleier recalled from AAA Norfolk.
May 17: RHP Stefan Crichton recalled from AAA Norfolk; RHP Miguel Castro recalled from AA Bowie; LHP Donnie Hart optioned to AAA Norfolk.
May 22: RHP Miguel Castro optioned to AA Bowie; RHP Tyler Wilson recalled from AAA Norfolk.
May 23: RHP Stefan Crichton optioned to AAA Norfolk; LHP Jayson Aquino recalled from AAA Norfolk.
May 27: LHP Jayson Aquino optioned to AAA Norfolk; LHP Donnie Hart recalled from AAA Norfolk.
May 28: RHP Tyler Wilson optioned to AAA Norfolk; RHP Logan Verrett recalled from AAA Norfolk.
May 31: LHP Logan Verrett optioned to AAA Norfolk; RHP Mike Wright recalled from AAA Norfolk.

June 7: LHP Donnie Hart optioned to AAA Norfolk.
June 9: RHP Stefan Crichton recalled from AAA Norfolk.
June 11: RHP Stefan Crichton optioned to AAA Norfolk; RHP Logan Verrett recalled from AAA Norfolk.
June 12: RHP Miguel Castro recalled from AA Bowie.
June 16: RHP Jimmy Yacabonis optioned to AAA Norfolk; LHP Vidal Nuno & RHP Gabriel Ynoa recalled from AAA Norfolk.
June 20: LHP Vidal Nuno & 1B David Washington optioned to AAA Norfolk; LHP Donnie Hart recalled from AAA Norfolk.
June 23: RHP Gabriel Ynoa optioned to AAA Norfolk.
June 24: RHP Miguel Castro optioned to AA Bowie; RHP Stefan Crichton recalled from AAA Norfolk.
June 30: RHP Miguel Castro recalled from AA Bowie.

July 1: RHP Alec Asher optioned to AAA Norfolk; RHP Jimmy Yacabonis recalled from AAA Norfolk.
July 4: Jimmy Yacabonis optioned to AAA Norfolk; Tyler Wilson recalled from AAA Norfolk.
July 5: RHP Tyler Wilson optioned to AAA Norfolk; LHP Jayson Aquino recalled from AAA Norfolk.
July 6: LHP Jayson Aquino optioned to AAA Norfolk.
July 17: RHP Stefan Crichton optioned to AAA Norfolk.
July 22: RHP Mike Wright optioned to AAA Norfolk.

August 9: LHP Donnie Hart optioned to AAA Norfolk.
August 17: LF Joey Rickard optioned to AAA Norfolk.
August 20: RHP Alec Asher recalled from AAA Norfolk.
August 23: RHP Alec Asher optioned to AAA Norfolk.
August 25: RHP Mike Wright recalled from AAA Norfolk.
August 28: RHP Mike Wright optioned to AAA Norfolk; LHP Donnie Hart recalled from AAA Norfolk.
August 29: LHP Donnie Hart optioned to AAA Norfolk.

September 1: LF Joey Rickard and RHP Jimmy Yacabonis recalled from AAA Norfolk.
September 2: LHP Donnie Hart and RHP Alec Asher recalled from AAA Norfolk.
September 3: RHP Alec Asher optioned to AA Bowie; RHP Gabriel Ynoa recalled from AAA Norfolk.
September 7: RHP Mike Wright recalled from AAA Norfolk.

October 2: RHP Stefan Crichton and LHP Chris Lee recalled from AAA Norfolk; RHP Yefry Ramirez, RHP Alec Asher, and RHP Jesus Liranzo recalled from AA Bowie.

Injuries etc.
April 2: LHP Wade Miley (Upper respiratory infection), RHP Chris Tillman (Right shoulder bursitis), & OF Anthony Santander (Strained right forearm) placed on the 10-day disabled list, retroactive to March 30.
April 9: OF Joey Rickard (sprained finger) placed on the 10-day disabled list; LHP Wade Miley activated from the 10-day disabled list
April 16: LHP Zach Britton (forearm strain) placed on the 10-day disabled list, retroactive to April 15.
April 28: LF Joey Rickard activated from the 10-day disabled list.

May 1: LHP Zach Britton activated from the 10-day disabled list; C Welington Castillo (Right shoulder tendinitis) placed on the 10-day disabled list, retroactive to May 1.
May 6: LHP Zach Britton (Left forearm strain) placed on the 10-day disabled list, retroactive to May 5, 2017; RHP Gabriel Ynoa (Right hamstring strain) placed on the 10-day disabled list.
May 7: RHP Chris Tillman activated from the 10-day disabled list.
May 14: C Welington Castillo activated from the 10-day disabled list.
May 20: SS Ryan Flaherty (Right shoulder strain) placed on the 10-day disabled list, retroactive to May 19, 2016.
May 31: C Welington Castillo (Groin contusion) placed on the 10-day disabled list.

June 9: RHP Darren O'Day (Right shoulder strain) placed on the 10-day disabled list, retroactive to June 7, 2017.
June 10: C Welington Castillo activated from the 10-day disabled list.
June 14: OF Anthony Santander transferred from the 10-day disabled list to the 60-day disabled list; 1B Chris Davis (Right oblique strain) placed on the 10-day disabled list, retroactive to June 13.
June 16: RHP Mike Wright (Right shoulder bursitis) placed on the 10-day disabled list retroactive to June 15, 2017.
June 19: SS J.J. Hardy (Right wrist fracture) placed on the 10-day disabled list.
June 20: LHP Zach Britton transferred from the 10-day disabled list to the 60-day disabled list.
June 23: RHP Darren O'Day activated from the 10-day disabled list.

July 5: LHP Zach Britton reactivated from 60-day disabled list; RHP Chris Tillman placed on paternity list; IF Ryan Flaherty transferred from the 10-day disabled list to the 60-day disabled list.
July 8: RHP Chris Tillman activated from the paternity list.
July 14: 1B Chris Davis activated from the 10-day disabled list.
July 31: 	SS J.J. Hardy transferred from the 10-day disabled list to the 60-day disabled list; DH Mark Trumbo (Right rib cage strain) placed on the 10-day disabled list, retroactive to July 30.

August 9: DH Mark Trumbo activated from the 10-day disabled list.
August 17: SS Ryan Flaherty and OF Anthony Santander activated from the 60-day disabled list.
August 20: RHP Miguel Castro placed on the bereavement list.
August 23: RHP Miguel Castro activated from the bereavement list.
August 25: RHP Dylan Bundy on the placed bereavement list.
August 29: RHP Dylan Bundy activated from bereavement list.

September 2: LF Craig Gentry (Fractured right finger) placed on the 10-day disabled list.
September 8: SS J.J. Hardy activated from the 60-day disabled list.
September 12: LF Craig Gentry activated from the 10-day disabled list.

Season highlights
 On April 16, rookie outfielder/DH Trey Mancini tied an MLB record with 7 home runs in his first 12 big-league games. He tied another record on April 22 with 8 homers in his first 17 games.
 On April 26, RF Seth Smith was instrumental in a bizarre extra-inning win over Tampa Bay with a two-run "Little League homer" (a single plus two throwing errors) and a "walk-off walk," drawing a base on balls with the sacks full in the bottom of the 11th.
 On May 22, CF Adam Jones hit his 125th home run in Camden Yards, passing Rafael Palmeiro to become the all-time home run leader at Camden Yards.
 On May 31, returning to the lineup after missing four games due to an ankle injury, Adam Jones went 3–5 with a home run and five RBIs, collecting his 1500th career hit as an Oriole.
 On July 23 closer Zach Britton threw his 55th consecutive save, breaking the American League record set by Boston's Tom Gordon in 1998–99.
 On August 3 against the Tigers, the Orioles turned a rare triple play, Machado to Schoop to Davis.
 On August 18, Manny Machado hits his third grand slam of the season, becoming the first Oriole with multiple 3+ grand slam seasons. Machado becomes just the third player in MLB history with back-to-back 3+ grand slam seasons.
 On August 23 Britton's American League record save streak ended at 60, as he allowed the Athletics to tie the game in the 9th. Britton had last failed to convert a save opportunity on October 1, 2015.
 On August 28, Adam Jones became the first player in franchise history to record seven consecutive seasons with 25 or more home runs.
 On August 31, Adam Jones hit the Orioles' 56th home run of the month, setting a new MLB record for most home runs in the month of August. Chris Davis added another homer to extend the record to 57, also the third most in any calendar month in MLB history. 
 On August 31, Jonathan Schoop became the third middle infielder in Orioles history to record 30+ homers and 100+ RBIs in a single season.
 For the month of August, Tim Beckham collects 50 hits, the second most in a single calendar month in Orioles history.

Season standings

American League East

American League Wild Card

Record vs. Opponents

Game log

|- bgcolor=#bfb
| 1 || April 3 || Blue Jays || 3–2 (11) || Wilson (1–0) || Grilli (0–1) || — || 45,667 || 1–0 || W1
|- bgcolor=#bfb
| 2 || April 5 || Blue Jays || 3–1 || Bundy (1–0) || Happ (0–1) || Britton (1) || 16,086 || 2–0 || W2
|- bgcolor=#bfb
| 3 || April 7 || Yankees || 6–5 || Hart (1–0) || Clippard (0–1) || Britton (2) || 25,248 || 3–0 || W3
|- bgcolor=#bfb
| 4 || April 8 || Yankees || 5–4 || Givens (1–0) || Betances (0–1) || Britton (3) || 38,916 || 4–0 || W4
|- bgcolor=#fbb
| 5 || April 9 || Yankees || 3–7 || Betances (1–1) || O'Day (0–1) || — || 42,487 || 4–1 || L1
|- bgcolor=#fbb
| 6 || April 11 || @ Red Sox || 1–8 || Pomeranz (1–0) || Bundy (1–1) || — || 37,497 || 4–2 || L2
|- bgcolor=#bfb
| 7 || April 12 || @ Red Sox || 12–5 || Givens (2–0) || Wright (0–1) || — || 32,211 || 5–2 || W1
|- bgcolor=#bfb
| 8 || April 13 || @ Blue Jays || 2–1 || Gausman (1–0) || Liriano (0–1) || Britton (4) || 32,957 || 6–2 || W2
|- bgcolor=#bfb
| 9 || April 14 || @ Blue Jays || 6–4 || Miley (1–0) || Sanchez (0–1) || Britton (5) || 39,547 || 7–2 || W3
|- bgcolor=#fbb
| 10 || April 15 || @ Blue Jays || 1–2 || Osuna (1–0) || Wilson (1–1) || — || 40,743 || 7–3 || L1
|- bgcolor=#bfb
| 11 || April 16 || @ Blue Jays || 11–4 || Bundy (2–1) || Happ (0–3) || — || 38,188 || 8–3 || W1
|- bgcolor=#fbb
| 12 || April 18 || @ Reds || 3–9 || Arroyo (1–2) || Gausman (1–1) || — || 16,018 || 8–4 || L1
|- bgcolor=#bfb
| 13 || April 19 || @ Reds || 2–0 || Jiménez (1–0) || Garrett (2–1) || Brach (1) || 15,083 || 9–4 || W1
|- bgcolor=#bfb
| 14 || April 20 || @ Reds || 2–1 (10) || O'Day (1–1) || Wood (0–2) || Brach (2) || 11,910 || 10–4 || W2
|- bgcolor=#bfb
| 15 || April 21 || Red Sox || 2–0 || Bundy (3–1) || Pomeranz (1–1) || Brach (3) || 34,442 || 11–4 || W3
|- bgcolor=#bfb
| 16 || April 22 || Red Sox || 4–2 || Aquino (1–0) || Wright (1–2) || O'Day (1) || 35,457 || 12–4 || W4
|- bgcolor=#fbb
| 17 || April 23 || Red Sox || 2–6 || Rodriguez (1–1) || Gausman (1–2) || Kimbrel (7) || 35,522 || 12–5 || L1
|- bgcolor=#bfb
| 18 || April 24 || Rays || 6–3 || Givens (3–0) || Archer (2–1) || Brach (4)|| 11,142 || 13–5 || W1
|- bgcolor=#fbb
| 19 || April 25 || Rays || 0–2 || Whitley (1–0) || Miley (1–1) || Colomé (5) || 11,472 || 13–6 || L1
|- bgcolor=#bfb
| 20 || April 26 || Rays || 5–4 (11) || Asher (1–0) || Colomé (0–1) || — || 16,289 || 14–6 || W1
|- bgcolor=#fbb
| 21 || April 28 || @ Yankees || 11–14 (10) || Chapman (1–0) || Aquino (0–1) || — || 36,912 || 14–7 || L1
|- bgcolor=#fbb
| 22 || April 29 || @ Yankees || 4–12 || Pineda (3–1) || Jiménez (1–1) || — || 37,303 || 14–8 || L2
|- bgcolor=#bfb
| 23 || April 30 || @ Yankees || 7–4 (11)|| Verrett (1–0) || Mitchell (1–1) || — || 41,022 || 15–8 || W1
|-

|- bgcolor=#bfb
| 24 || May 1 || @ Red Sox || 5–2 || Bundy (4–1) || Porcello (1–4) || Brach (5) || 33,489 || 16–8 || W2
|- bgcolor=#fbb
| 25 || May 2 || @ Red Sox || 2–5 || Sale (2–2) || Asher (1–1) || Kimbrel (9) || 32,932 || 16–9 || L1
|- bgcolor=#fbb
| 26 || May 3 || @ Red Sox || 2–4 || Pomeranz (3–1) || Gausman (1–3) || Kimbrel (10) || 33,162 || 16–10 || L2
|- bgcolor=#bfb
| 27 || May 4 || @ Red Sox || 8–3 || Wilson (2–1) || Kendrick (0–1) || — || 36,563 || 17–10 || W1
|- bgcolor=#bfb
| 28 || May 5 || White Sox || 4–2 || Ynoa (1–0) || González (3–2) || Brach (6) || 20,302 || 18–10 || W2
|- bgcolor=#bfb
| 29 || May 6 || White Sox || 6–5 || Bundy (5–1) || Covey (0–3) || O'Day (2) || 28,718 || 19–10 || W3
|- bgcolor=#bfb
| 30 || May 7 || White Sox || 4–0 || Tillman (1–0) || Quintana (2–5) || Brach (7) || 31,806 || 20–10 || W4
|- bgcolor=#bfb
| 31 || May 8 || Nationals || 6–4 || Gausman (2–3) || Gonzalez (3–1) || Brach (8) || 23,525 || 21–10 || W5
|- bgcolor=#bfb
| 32 || May 9 || Nationals || 5–4 (12) || Verrett (2–0) ||  Turner (1–1) || — || 26,348 || 22–10 || W6
|- bgcolor=#fbb
| 33 || May 10 || @ Nationals || 6–7 || Albers (2–0) || Brach (0–1) || — || 32,984 || 22–11 || L1
|- bgcolor=#bbb
| — || May 11 || @ Nationals || colspan=7 | Postponed (rain). Makeup date June 8.
|- bgcolor=#fbb
| 34 || May 12 || @ Royals || 2–3 || Soria (2–1) || Nuño (0–1) || Herrera (6) || 25,467 || 22–12 || L2
|- bgcolor=#fbb
| 35 || May 13 || @ Royals || 3–4 || Maness (1–0) || Asher (1–2) || Herrera (7) || 24,662 || 22–13 || L3
|- bgcolor=#fbb
| 36 || May 14 || @ Royals || 8–9 || Strahm (1–2) || Bleier (0–1) || Herrera (8) || 30,662 || 22–14 || L4
|- bgcolor=#bfb
| 37 || May 16 || @ Tigers || 13–11 (13) || Bleier (1–1) || Rodríguez (1–5) || — || 25,109 || 23–14 || W1
|- bgcolor=#fbb
| 38 || May 17 || @ Tigers || 4–5 || Fulmer (5–1) || Jiménez (1–2) || J Wilson (3) || 29,722 || 23–15 || L1
|- bgcolor=#fbb
| 39 || May 18 || @ Tigers || 5–6 || Zimmermann (4–2) || Bundy (5–2) || A Wilson (2) || 32,455 || 23–16 || L2
|- bgcolor=#bfb
| 40 || May 19 || Blue Jays || 5–3 (10) || Givens (4–0) || Grilli (1–4) || — || 31,916 || 24–16 ||W1
|- bgcolor=#bfb
| 41 || May 20 || Blue Jays || 7–5 || Givens (5–0) || Barnes (0–2) || Brach (9) || 45,416 || 25–16 ||W2
|- bgcolor=#fbb
| 42 || May 21 || Blue Jays || 1–3 || Estrada (3–2) || Miley (1–2) || Osuna (6) || 36,632 || 25–17 || L1
|- bgcolor=#fbb
| 43 || May 22 || Twins || 7–14 || Gibson (1–4) || Wilson (2–2) || — || 12,882 || 25–18 || L2
|- bgcolor=#fbb
| 44 || May 23 || Twins || 0–2 || Santana (7–2) || Bundy (5–3) || — || 13,294 || 25–19 || L3
|- bgcolor=#fbb
| 45 || May 24 || Twins || 3–4 || Berríos (3–0) || Tillman (1–1) || Kintzler (12) || 32,267 || 25–20 || L4
|- bgcolor=#fbb
| 46 || May 26 || @ Astros || 0–2 || Musgrove (4–4) || Gausman (2–4) || Giles (14) || 31,380 || 25–21 || L5
|- bgcolor=#fbb
| 47 || May 27 || @ Astros || 2–5 || Keuchel (8–0) || Miley (1–3) || Harris (2) || 32,761 || 25–22 || L6
|- bgcolor=#fbb
| 48 || May 28 || @ Astros || 4–8 || McCullers Jr. (6–1) || Asher (1–3) || — || 34,720 || 25–23 || L7
|- bgcolor=#bfb
| 49 || May 29 || Yankees || 3–2 || Bundy (6–3) || Montgomery (2–4) || Brach (10) || 40,242 || 26–23 || W1
|- bgcolor=#fbb
| 50 || May 30 || Yankees || 3–8 || Severino (4–2) || Tillman (1–2) || — || 16,126 || 26–24 || L1
|- bgcolor=#bfb
| 51 || May 31 || Yankees || 10–4 || Gausman (3–4) || Tanaka (5–5) || — || 22,983 || 27–24 || W1
|-

|- bgcolor=#bfb
| 52 || June 1 || Red Sox || 7–5 || Miley (2–3) || Rodriguez (4–2) || — || 20,150 || 28–24 || W2
|- bgcolor=#bfb
| 53 || June 2 || Red Sox || 3–2 || Asher (2–3) || Porcello (3–7) || Brach (11) || 33,193 || 29–24 || W3
|- bgcolor=#fbb
| 54 || June 3 || Red Sox || 2–5 || Price (1–0) || Bundy (6–4) || Kimbrel (16) || 35,470 || 29–25 || L1
|- bgcolor=#fbb
| 55 || June 4 || Red Sox || 3–7 || Sale (7–2) || Tillman (1–3) ||—
| 31,819 || 29–26 || L2 
|- bgcolor=#bfb
| 56 || June 6 || Pirates || 6–5 (10) || Brach (3–1) || LeBlanc (1–1) || — || 26,724 || 30–26 || W1
|- bgcolor=#bfb
| 57 || June 7 || Pirates || 9–6 (11) || Givens (6–0) || LeBlanc (1–2) || — || 19,957 || 31–26 || W2
|- bgcolor=#fbb
| 58 || June 8 || @ Nationals || 1–6 || Ross (3–2) || Asher (2–4) || — || 37,833 || 31–27 || L1
|- bgcolor=#fbb
| 59 || June 9 || @ Yankees || 2–8 || Montgomery (4–4) || Bundy (6–5) || — || 46,031 || 31–28 || L2
|- bgcolor=#fbb
| 60 || June 10 || @ Yankees || 3–16 || Severino (5–2) || Tillman (1–4) || — || 45,232 || 31–29 || L3
|- bgcolor=#fbb
| 61 || June 11 || @ Yankees || 3–14 || Warren (2–1) || Gausman (3–5) || — || 46,348 || 31–30 || L4
|- bgcolor=#fbb
| 62 || June 12 || @ White Sox || 7–10 || Petricka (1–0) || Miley (2–4) || — || 17,665 || 31–31 || L5
|- bgcolor=#fbb
| 63 || June 13 || @ White Sox || 1–6 || Holland (5–6) || Asher (2–5) || — || 15,038 || 31–32 || L6
|- bgcolor=#bfb
| 64 || June 14 || @ White Sox || 10–6 || Bundy (7–5) || González (4–8) || — || 20,008 || 32–32 || W1
|- bgcolor=#fbb
| 65 || June 15 || @ White Sox || 2–5 || Swarzak (3–1) || Tillman (1–5) || — || 20,139 || 32–33 || L1
|- bgcolor=#fbb
| 66 || June 16 || Cardinals || 2–11 || Martinez (6–5) || Gausman (3–6) || — || 26,341 || 32–34 || L2
|- bgcolor=#bfb
| 67 || June 17 || Cardinals || 15–7 || Miley (3–4) || Wainwright (7–5) || — || 27,788 || 33–34 ||W1
|- bgcolor=#bfb
| 68 || June 18 || Cardinals || 8–5 || Jiménez (2–2) || Lynn (5–4) || Brach (12) || 34,854 || 34–34 || W2
|- bgcolor=#fbb
| 69 || June 19 || Indians || 0–12 || Kluber (6–2) || Bundy (7–6) || — || 13,875 || 34–35 || L1
|- bgcolor=#bfb
| 70 || June 20 || Indians || 6–5 || Castro (1–0) || Shaw (1–2) || Brach (13) || 22,891 || 35–35 || W1
|- bgcolor=#fbb
| 71 || June 21 || Indians || 1–5 || Carrasco (8–3) || Gausman (3–7) || Shaw (2) || 29,596 || 35–36 || L1
|- bgcolor=#fbb
| 72 || June 22 || Indians || 3–6 || Clevinger (3–3) || Miley (3–5) || — || 24,954 || 35–37 || L2
|- bgcolor=#fbb
| 73 || June 23 || @ Rays || 5–15 || Archer (6–4) || Jiménez (2–3) || Pruitt (1) || 18,929 || 35–38 || L3
|- bgcolor=#bfb
| 74 || June 24 || @ Rays || 8–3 || Bundy (8–6) || Alvarado (0–3) || — || 23,902 || 36–38 || W1
|- bgcolor=#bfb
| 75 || June 25 || @ Rays || 8–5 || Brach (2–1) || Colomé (1–3) || — || 15,943 || 37–38 || W2
|- bgcolor=#bfb
| 76 || June 27 || @ Blue Jays || 3–1 || Gausman (4–7) || Biagini (2–7) || Brach (14) || 40,606 || 38–38 || W3
|- bgcolor=#fbb
| 77 || June 28 || @ Blue Jays || 0–4 || Stroman (8–4) || Miley (3–6) || — || 38,847 || 38–39 || L1
|- bgcolor=#bfb
| 78 || June 29 || @ Blue Jays || 2–0 || Jiménez (3–3) || Happ (2–5) || Brach (15) || 37,291 || 39–39 || W1
|- bgcolor=#fbb
| 79 || June 30 || Rays || 4–6 || Díaz (1–3) || O'Day (1–2) || Colomé (21) || 24,398 || 39–40 || L1
|-

|- bgcolor=#fbb
| 80 || July 1 || Rays || 3–10 || Odorizzi (5–3) || Bundy (8–7) || — || 28,346 || 39–41 || L2
|- bgcolor=#bfb
| 81 || July 2 || Rays || 7–1 || Gausman (5–7) || Cobb (6–6) || — || 26,489 || 40–41 || W1
|- bgcolor=#fbb
| 82 || July 3 || @ Brewers || 1–8 || Suter (1–1) || Miley (3–7) || — || 36,457 || 40–42 || L1
|- bgcolor=#fbb
| 83 || July 4 || @ Brewers || 2–6 || Nelson (7–4) || Jiménez (3–4) || — || 31,818 || 40–43 || L2
|- bgcolor=#fbb
| 84 || July 5 || @ Brewers || 0–4 || Garza (4–4) || Aquino (1–2) || — || 27,734 || 40–44 || L3
|- bgcolor=#fbb
| 85 || July 6 || @ Twins || 4–6 || Berríos (8–2) || Bundy (8–8) || Kintzler (23) || 19,706 || 40–45 || L4
|- bgcolor=#fbb
| 86 || July 7 || @ Twins || 6–9 || Hildenberger (1–0) || M. Castro (1–1) || Kintzler (24) || 28,668 || 40–46 || L5
|- bgcolor=#bfb
| 87 || July 8 || @ Twins || 5–1 || Miley (4–7) || Mejía (4–4) || — || 26,323 || 41–46 || W1
|- bgcolor=#bfb
| 88 || July 9 || @ Twins || 11–5 ||  Jiménez (4–4) || Gibson (5–7) || — || 25,848 || 42–46 || W2
|- bgcolor=#bbcaff
| ASG || July 11 || @ Marlins Park || AL 2–1 (10) NL || Kimbrel || Davis || Miller || 37,188 || — || Box
|- bgcolor=#fbb
| 89 || July 14 || Cubs || 8–9 || Uehara (3–4) || Brach (2–2) || Davis (17) || 34,335 || 42–47 || L1
|- bgcolor=#fbb
| 90 || July 15 || Cubs || 3–10 || Arrieta (9–7) || Miley (4–8) || — || 40,258 || 42–48 || L2
|- bgcolor=#fbb
| 91 || July 16 || Cubs || 0–8 || Quintana (5–8) || Jiménez (4–5) || — || 31,105 || 42–49 || L3
|- bgcolor=#bfb
| 92 || July 17 || Rangers || 3–1 || Bleier (2–1) || Cashner (4–8) || Brach (16) || 14,922 || 43–49 || W1
|- bgcolor=#bfb
| 93 || July 18 || Rangers || 12–1 || Bundy (9–8) || Ross (2–2) || — || 18,119 || 44–49 || W2
|- bgcolor=#bfb
| 94 || July 19 || Rangers || 10–2 || Gausman (6–7) || Pérez (5–7) || — || 15,693 || 45–49 || W3
|- bgcolor=#bfb
| 95 || July 20 || Rangers || 9–7 || Castro (2–1) || Hamels (4–1) || — || 14,961 || 46–49 || W4
|- bgcolor=#fbb
| 96 || July 21 || Astros || 7–8 || Fiers (7–4) || Jiménez (4–6) || Giles (21) || 25,784 || 46–50 || L1
|- bgcolor=#fbb
| 97 || July 22 || Astros || 4–8 || Martes (3–0) || O'Day (1–3) || — || 32,524 || 46–51 || L2
|- bgcolor=#bfb
| 98 || July 23 || Astros || 9–7 || Givens (7–0) || Gregerson (2–3) || Britton (6) || 21,533 || 47–51 || W1
|- bgcolor=#bfb
| 99 || July 24 || @ Rays || 5–0 || Gausman (7–7) || Snell (0–6) || — || 15,187 || 48–51 || W2
|- bgcolor=#fbb
| 100 || July 25 || @ Rays || 4–5 || Faria (5–1) || Miley (4–9) || Colomé (29) || 12,471 || 48–52 || L1
|- bgcolor=#fbb
| 101 || July 26 || @ Rays || 1–5 || Cobb (9–6) || Jiménez (4–7) || — || 18,430 || 48–53 || L2
|- bgcolor=#fbb
| 102 || July 28 || @ Rangers || 2–8 || Cashner (6–8) || Tillman (1–6) || — || 36,270 || 48–54 || L3
|- bgcolor=#bfb
| 103 || July 29 || @ Rangers || 4–0 || Gausman (8–7) || Bibens-Dirkx (3–1) || Britton (7) || 44,658 || 49–54 || W1
|- bgcolor=#bfb
| 104 || July 30 || @ Rangers || 10–6 || Miley (5–9) || Perez (5–9) || Britton (8) || 32,437 || 50–54 || W2
|- bgcolor=#bfb
| 105 || July 31 || Royals || 2–1 || Britton (1–0) || Soria (4–3) || — || 20,663 || 51–54 || W3
|-

|- bgcolor=#bfb
| 106 || August 1 || Royals || 7–2 || Bundy (10–8) || Kennedy (4–7) || — || 20,931 || 52–54 || W4
|- bgcolor=#bfb
| 107 || August 2 || Royals || 6–0 || Hellickson (7–5) || Vargas (13–5) || — || 14,984 || 53–54 || W5
|- bgcolor=#fbb
| 108 || August 3 || Tigers || 5–7 || Saupold (3–1) || Tillman (1–7) || Greene (3) || 17,157 || 53–55 || L1
|- bgcolor=#fbb
| 109 || August 4 || Tigers || 2–5 || Verlander (7–7) || Givens (7–1) || Rondón (1) || 22,882 || 53–56 || L2
|- bgcolor=#bfb
| 110 || August 5 || Tigers || 5–2 || Brach (3–2) || Jimenez (0–1) || Britton (9) || 33,911 || 54–56 || W1
|- bgcolor=#bfb
| 111 || August 6 || Tigers || 12–3 || Jiménez (5–7) || Sánchez (3–2) || — || 30,144 || 55–56 || W2
|- bgcolor=#bfb
| 112 || August 7 || @ Angels || 6–2 || Bundy (11–8) || Ramirez (10–10) || — || 34,142 || 56–56 || W3
|- bgcolor=#fbb
| 113 || August 8 || @ Angels || 2–3 || Bridwell (6–1) || Hellickson (7–6) ||Middleton (1) || 35,723 || 56–57 || L1
|- bgcolor=#fbb
| 114 || August 9 || @ Angels || 1–5 || Scribner (2–0) || Gausman (8–8) || — || 36,202 || 56–58 || L2
|- bgcolor=#bfb
| 115 || August 10 || @ Athletics || 7–2 || Miley (6–9) || Smith (0–2) || Britton (10) || 11,386 || 57–58 || W1
|- bgcolor=#fbb
| 116 || August 11 || @ Athletics || 4–5 || Casilla (3–5) || Brach (3–3) || Treinen (6) || 14,330 || 57–59 ||L1
|- bgcolor=#bfb
| 117 || August 12 || @ Athletics || 12–5 || Bundy (12–8) || Manaea (8–7) || — || 29,742 || 58–59 || W1
|- bgcolor=#fbb
| 118 || August 13 || @ Athletics || 3–9 || Graveman (3–3) || Hellickson (7–7) || — || 18,912 || 58–60 || L1
|- bgcolor=#bfb
| 119 || August 14 || @ Mariners || 11–3 || Gausman (9–8) || Gallardo (5–8) || — || 17,973 || 59–60 || W1
|- bgcolor=#fbb
| 120 || August 15 || @ Mariners || 1–3 || Albers (1–0) || Miley (6–10) || Diaz (26) || 24,927 || 59–61 || L1
|- bgcolor=#fbb
| 121 || August 16 || @ Mariners || 6–7 || Zych (6–3) || Jiménez (5–8) || Rzepczynski (1) || 33,448 || 59–62 ||L2
|- bgcolor=#bfb
| 122 || August 18 || Angels || 9–7 || O'Day (1–3) || Middleton (4–1) || — || 26,185 || 60–62 || W1
|- bgcolor=#fbb
| 123 || August 19 || Angels || 1–5 || Ramírez (11–10) || Gausman (9–9) || — || 43,929 || 60–63 || L1
|- bgcolor=#fbb
| 124 || August 20 || Angels || 4–5 || Bedrosian (3–2) || Brach (3–3) || Norris (19) || 24,715 || 60–64 || L2
|- bgcolor=#bfb
| 125 || August 21 || Athletics || 7–3 || Miley (7–10) || Smith (0–3) || Britton (11) || 16,020 || 61–64 || W1
|- bgcolor=#fbb
| 126 || August 22 || Athletics || 4–6 || Castro (1–1) || Jiménez (5–9) || Treinen (8) || 18,493 || 61–65 || L1
|- bgcolor=#bfb
| 127 || August 23 || Athletics || 8–7 (12) || Castro (3–1) || Castro (1–2) || — || 20,072 || 62–65 || W1
|- bgcolor=#bfb
| 128 || August 25 || @ Red Sox || 16–3 || Hellickson (8–7) || Porcello (8–15) || — || 37,191 || 63–65 || W2
|- bgcolor=#bfb
| 129 || August 26 || @ Red Sox || 7–0 || Gausman (10–9) || Rodríguez (4–4) || — || 36,655 || 64–65 || W3
|- bgcolor=#bfb
| 130 || August 27 || @ Red Sox || 2–1 || Miley (8–10) || Fister (3–7) || Brach (17) || 36,625 || 65–65 || W4
|- bgcolor=#bfb
| 131 || August 28 || Mariners || 7–6 || Hart (2–0) || Pagan (1–3) || Britton (12) || 15,106 || 66–65 ||W5
|- bgcolor=#bfb
| 132 || August 29 || Mariners || 4–0 || Bundy (13–8) || Ramírez (5–5) || — || 13,736 || 67–65 || W6
|- bgcolor=#bfb
| 133 || August 30 || Mariners || 8–7 || Brach (4–4) || Bergman (4–5) || Britton (13) || 16,983 || 68–65 || W7
|- bgcolor=#fbb
| 134 || August 31 || Blue Jays || 8–11 || Estrada (7–8) || Hellickson (8–8) || Osuna (35) || 13,802 || 68–66 || L1
|-

|- bgcolor=#bfb
| 135 || September 1 || Blue Jays || 1–0 (13) || Yacabonis (1–0) || Loup (2–3) || — || 16,627 || 69–66 || W1
|- bgcolor=#fbb
| 136 || September 2 || Blue Jays || 2–7 || Dermody (2–0) || Miley (8–11) || — || 14,815 || 69–67 || L1
|- bgcolor=#bfb
| 137 || September 3 || Blue Jays || 5–4 (12) || Yacabonis (2–0) || Barnes (2–6) || — || 27,231 || 70–67 || W1
|- bgcolor=#fbb
| 138 || September 4 || Yankees || 4–7 || Green (3–0) || Bundy (13–9) || — || 37,622 || 70–68 || L1
|- bgcolor=#bfb
| 139 || September 5 || Yankees || 7–6 || Britton (2–0) || Betances (3–6) || — || 14,377 || 71–68 || W1
|- bgcolor=#bbb
| — || September 6 || Yankees || colspan=7 | Postponed (rain). Makeup date September 7.
|- bgcolor=#fbb
| 140 || September 7 || Yankees || 1–9 || Gray (9–9) || Gausman (10–10) || — || 14,946 || 71–69 || L1
|- bgcolor=#fbb
| 141 || September 8 || @ Indians || 0–5 || Clevinger (9–5) || Miley (8–12) || — || 30,090 || 71–70 || L2
|- bgcolor=#fbb
| 142 || September 9 || @ Indians || 2–4 || Tomlin (9–9) || Ynoa (1–1) || Allen (25) || 30,459 || 71–71 || L3
|- bgcolor=#fbb
| 143 || September 10 || @ Indians || 2–3 || Bauer (16–8) || Hellickson (8–9) || Allen (26) || 21,259 || 71–72 || L4
|- bgcolor=#fbb
| 144 || September 11 || @ Blue Jays || 3–4 || Estrada (8–8) || Jiménez (5–10) || Leone (1) || 28,401 || 71–73 || L5
|- bgcolor=#fbb
| 145 || September 12 || @ Blue Jays || 2–3 || Mayza (1–0) || Britton (2–1) || — || 29,055 || 71–74 || L6
|- bgcolor=#bfb
| 146 || September 13 || @ Blue Jays || 2–1 || Gausman (11–10) || Stroman (11–8) || Britton (14) || 31,714 || 72–74 || W1
|- bgcolor=#fbb
| 147 || September 14 || @ Yankees || 5–13 || Tanaka (12–11) || Miley (8–13) || — || 37,128 || 72–75 || L1
|- bgcolor=#fbb
| 148 || September 15 || @ Yankees || 2–8 || Severino (13–6) || Ynoa (1–2) || — || 40,460 || 72–76 || L2
|- bgcolor=#fbb
| 149 || September 16 || @ Yankees || 3–9 || Montgomery (8–7) || Hellickson (8–10) || — || 40,114 || 72–77 || L3
|- bgcolor=#bfb
| 150 || September 17 || @ Yankees || 6–4 || Jiménez (6–10) || Gray (9–11) || Britton (15) || 38,189 || 73–77 || W1
|- bgcolor=#fbb
| 151 || September 18 || Red Sox || 8–10 (10) || Barnes (7–3) || Castro (3–2) || Smith (1) || 16,716 || 73–78 || L1
|- bgcolor=#fbb
| 152 || September 19 || Red Sox || 0–1 (11) || Kelly (4–1) || Brach (4–5) || Barnes (1) || 21,449 || 73–79 || L2
|- bgcolor=#fbb
| 153 || September 20 || Red Sox || 0–9 || Sale (17–7) || Miley (8–14) || — || 16,906 || 73–80 || L3
|- bgcolor=#bfb
| 154 || September 21 || Rays || 3–1 || Ynoa (2–2) || Andriese (5–4) || Brach (18) || 14,697 || 74–80 || W1
|- bgcolor=#fbb
| 155 || September 22 || Rays || 3–8 || Cobb (12–10) || Jiménez (6–11) || — || 28,835 || 74–81 || L1
|- style="text-align:center; background-color:#933; color:white"
| 156 || September 23 || Rays || 6–9 || Odorizzi (10–8) || Hellickson (8–11) || Colomé (46) || 42,802 || 74–82 || L2
|- bgcolor=#bfb
| 157 || September 24 || Rays || 9–4 || Givens (8–1) || Archer (9–12) || — || 23,242 || 75–82 || W1
|- bgcolor=#fbb
| 158 || September 26 || @ Pirates || 1–10 || Williams (7–9) || Gausman (11–11) || Brault (1) || 19,318 || 75–83 || L1
|- bgcolor=#fbb
| 159 || September 27 || @ Pirates || 3–5 || Kuhl (8–11) || Ynoa (2–3) || Rivero (20) || 24,779 || 75–84 || L2
|- bgcolor=#fbb
| 160 || September 29 || @ Rays || 0–7 || Boxberger (4–4) || Miley (8–15) || — || 21,142  || 75–85 || L3
|- bgcolor=#fbb
| 161 || September 30 || @ Rays || 3–4 || Archer (10–12) || Castro (3–3) || Colomé (47) || 15,416 || 75–86 || L4
|- bgcolor=#fbb
| 162 || October 1 || @ Rays || 0–6 || Snell (5–7) || Gausman (11–12) || — || 16,018 || 75–87 || L5
|-

Roster

Farm system

References

External links
2017 Baltimore Orioles season at Official site 
2017 Baltimore Orioles season at Baseball Reference

Baltimore Orioles seasons
Baltimore Orioles
2017 in sports in Maryland